Gunai may refer to:
 Gunai people, an ethnic group of Australia
 Gunai language, an Australian language
 Gunai, Iran, a village

See also 
 Gunay (disambiguation)

Language and nationality disambiguation pages